The Martinique curlytail lizard (Leiocephalus herminieri) is an extinct species of lizard in the family of curly-tailed lizard (Leiocephalidae).

Etymology
The specific name, herminieri, commemorates French naturalist Félix Louis L'Herminier.

Extant specimens
There are five specimens of L. herminieri, of which three are deposited in the National Museum of Natural History, Paris, one in London, and the other in Leiden.

Geographic range
Though Martinique is assumed as the geographic range of L. herminieri, there was some confusion about the type locality in the past. While André Marie Constant Duméril and Gabriel Bibron stated Martinique and Trinidad and Tobago as type locality, George Albert Boulenger has given only Trinidad and Tobago as terra typica.

Biology and extinction
The biology of L. herminieri, the reasons for its extinction, and the date of extinction are unknown. This species was last collected in the 1830s.

Description
Of the three specimens of L. herminieri in Paris, the largest female is measured at  snout-to-vent length (SVL), and the largest male at  SVL. The large head scales are more or less distinctly striate. The large dorsal scales are keeled and forming continuous oblique series. The smaller lateral and ventral scales are keeled too. The back is greenish brown with or without irregular yellowish crossbands. The head is yellowish with four or five black bars on the sides. The venter is yellowish. The throat has oblique black transverse bands.

References

Further reading
Boulenger GA (1885). Catalogue of the Lizards in the British Museum (Natural History). Second Edition. Volume II. Iguanidæ ... London: Trustees of the British Museum (Natural History). (Taylor and Francis, printers). xiii + 497 pp. + Plates I-XXIV. (Liocephalus [sic] herminieri, p. 166).
Duméril AMC, Bibron G (1837). Erpétologie générale ou Histoire naturelle complète des Reptiles. Tome quatrième [Volume 4]. Paris: Roret. ii + 571 pp. (Holotropis herminieri, new species, pp. 261–263 + Plate 44). (in French).
Gray JE (1845). Catalogue of the Specimens of Lizards in the Collection of the British Museum. London: Trustees of the British Museum. (Edward Newman, printer). xxviii + 289 pp. (Leiocephalus herminieri, p. 217).
Schwartz A, Henderson RW (1991). Amphibians and Reptiles of the West Indies: Descriptions, Distributions, and Natural History. Gainesville, Florida: University Press of Florida. 714 pp. .
Schwartz A, Thomas R (1975). A Check-list of West Indian Amphibians and Reptiles. Carnegie Museum of Natural History Special Publication No. 1. Pittsburgh, Pennsylvania: Carnegie Museum of Natural History. 216 pp. (Leiocephalus herminieri, p. 130).

External links
Illustration of Leiocephalus herminieri by Duméril and Bibron, PDF, 754 kb

Leiocephalus
Reptile extinctions since 1500
Extinct reptiles
Reptiles described in 1837
Taxa named by André Marie Constant Duméril
Taxa named by Gabriel Bibron
Taxonomy articles created by Polbot
Endemic fauna of Martinique